KRI Teluk Cendrawasih (533) is a  operated the Indonesian Navy. The ship was former Frankfurt/Oder (613) of the Volksmarine.

Characteristics
KRI Teluk Cendrawasih is a Project 108 (NATO reporting name: Frosch I) regular medium landing ship.

The ship is powered by two diesel engines, with total power output of  distributed in two shaft.

As Frankfurt/Oder, she was initially armed with two  twin 57 mm guns, two AK-230 twin barrel 30 mm guns and equipped with Muff Cob fire control radar. She may have been equipped with two 40-tube 122 mm rocket launchers. As Teluk Cendrawasih, the ship are rearmed with one single Bofors 40 mm L/60 gun, one twin V-11 37 mm L/63 guns, and two twin 2М-3 25 mm autocannons.

Service history
Frankfurt/Oder was built by VEB Peenewerft, Wolgast. The ship was laid down on 10 June 1975, launched on 2 January 1976 and was commissioned to Volksmarine on 2 February 1977. Following the reunification of Germany, Frankfurt/Oder was deleted on 1 October 1990 and was formally decommissioned from Volksmarine on 2 October. The unified German Navy didn't take over the ship and she was laid up with her pennant number painted over at Peenemünde Naval Base, awaiting her disposal as scrap metal.

Indonesian Navy acquired the ship on 25 August 1993 as part of warship procurement program headed by the then State Minister for Research and Technology, B. J. Habibie, as the Coordinator of the Procurement Team. The procurement program was based on the Presidential Instruction No. 3/1992 issued by President Suharto on 3 September 1992 which aimed to bolster the Navy capabilities. Prior to sailing for Indonesia, she was refitted and demilitarized in Germany. The ship arrived in Indonesia in 1994 and she was commissioned as KRI Teluk Cendrawasih (533) on 9 December 1994.

References

Bibliography

 

1976 ships
Frosch-class landing ships
Amphibious warfare vessels of the Indonesian Navy